Alamo Square Park, located at 215 South Tejon Street, is the site of the Colorado Springs Pioneers Museum, which has fine art and historical exhibits and a museum store.  A fountain, sculptures and gazebo are located in the park.

It was previously the El Paso County Courthouse from 1903 to 1973. The square was previously known as South Park.

See also
 List of parks in Colorado Springs, Colorado

References

Parks in Colorado Springs, Colorado